The Blackstone River Greenway (formerly Bikeway) is a partially completed  paved rail trail defining the course of the East Coast Greenway through the Blackstone Valley from Worcester, Massachusetts to Providence, Rhode Island.

Some  of completed trail in Massachusetts connect Worcester and Millbury, as well as 3.7 miles of trail connecting Uxbridge and Blackstone.

The path roughly parallels the right-of-way of the active Providence & Worcester Railroad and its predecessor, the Blackstone Canal, running alongside the Blackstone River. In some places, the bike path follows the old canal towpath, with the long-abandoned canal running along one side and the river on the other.  Only a short portion near Pratt Dam (a.k.a. Lonsdale Dam, connecting Lincoln, Rhode Island and Cumberland, Rhode Island) runs on abandoned railroad right-of-way.

Once finished, the greenway will be linked to the East Bay Bike Path, for an additional  of trail to Bristol, Rhode Island.  The Blackstone River Greenway is also a designated section of the East Coast Greenway, the 3,000-mile trail system connecting cities from Maine to Florida.

History 
In 1985, the Blackstone River Valley National Heritage Corridor (known after 1999 as the John H. Chafee Blackstone River Valley National Heritage Corridor) was designated by the United States Congress, following the path of the Blackstone River from Providence to Worcester.

Rhode Island

In 1997, the Rhode Island Department of Environmental Management and Department of Transportation began work on the first Rhode Island segment, from Lincoln to Ashton. This segment was completed in 1998. A second Rhode Island segment was completed in 2002, from Ashton to Manville. In August 2007, a bridge reconstruction project at Martin Street in Lincoln was completed, ending a three-year bike path closure. The new bridge incorporated a major safety improvement with the path passing underneath Martin Street instead of meeting it at grade. In November 2007, a  extension from Manville to the Woonsocket Water Treatment Plant was opened. A segment through the River's Edge Recreational Complex in Woonsocket was completed in 2008, and that segment was linked to the previously-completed portions to the south later that year. In 2011, an  segment of on-road bicycle lanes opened connecting the Blackstone River Greenway with the East Bay Bike Path, starting in Providence. In 2013, sharrows were painted through Woonsocket from the Massachusetts border to the River's Edge Recreational Complex. 

In early Summer 2017, a new  section of path was completed along the Seekonk River in Providence, stretching from Gano Street to Pitman Street, which was extended by a further  in 2020. Segment 8B1, a further  of path along Truman Drive in Woonsocket, was opened in 2020. Additional projects are under design to extend the path further through Woonsocket, connecting existing segments, as well as through the cities of Providence, Pawtucket, and Central Falls. 
 
Massachusetts

In 1996, a study undertaken by the Massachusetts Highway Department (MHD) and the Massachusetts Department of Conservation and Recreation (known at the time as the Department of Environmental Management) produced a plan for seven segments of trail linking Worcester with Blackstone, Massachusetts and the Rhode Island border.

 Blackstone to Millville (2.92 miles)
 Millville to Uxbridge (3.30 miles)
 Uxbridge to Northbridge (9.09 miles)
 Northbridge to Grafton (1.39 miles)
 Grafton to Millbury via Sutton (6.02 miles)
 Millbury to Worcester (4+ miles)
 Worcester (2.61 miles)

Construction was delayed due to a lack of state funds, a shortfall attributed to the over-budget "Big Dig" highway tunnel project in Boston. In 2005, as part of the Massachusetts Turnpike-Route 146 interchange project, the first  segment, from Worcester to Millbury, was opened to the public.

In 2010, an agreement was reached between MassDOT and DCR for DCR to take over the management of the design and environmental permitting of Sections 1 through 5 of the Greenway, including preparation of the Environmental Impact Report (EIR). Section 6 was previously constructed by MassDOT, and Section 7 will be designed by the City of Worcester, and constructed by MassDOT.

In 2013, five bridges in Blackstone that run concurrently with the Southern New England Trunkline Trail (SNETT) were repaired and repainted. These are the two Factory Pond Bridges, the northern Canal Street Bridge, a Blackstone River Bridge, and the St. Paul Street Bridge. By September 2014, these bridges received new ipe wood decks and safety railings. In 2014, new bridges were also constructed over Kane Court and Main Street, and a tunnel was built under Church Street, all in the town of Blackstone. The entire 3.7-mile path was finally completed in December 2016. Restoration work on the Blackstone Viaduct, located adjacent to the southern terminus of this path, began in 2019. When completed, this project will add approximately 0.5 miles of bike path extending to the Rhode Island border, where it will connect with an existing segment of path in Woonsocket.

All of the trail between the missing Blackstone River and Rte. 122 bridge in Blackstone and Rte. 146A in Uxbridge is part of both the SNETT and the Blackstone River Greenway.

Crossings

See also 
 Southern New England Trunkline Trail
 East Bay Bike Path
 Washington Secondary Rail Trail
 Greenways Alliance of Rhode Island

References

External links
 Blackstone River Greenway and Bikeway Access
Blackstone Bikeway and Visitors Center Rhode Island Department of Environmental Management Division of Parks & Recreation
Blackstone River Greenway Rails-to-Trails Conservancy

Rail trails in Massachusetts
Rail trails in Rhode Island
State parks of Rhode Island
East Coast Greenway
National Recreation Trails in Massachusetts
National Recreation Trails in Rhode Island
Protected areas of Providence County, Rhode Island
Protected areas of Worcester County, Massachusetts
Protected areas established in 1985
1985 establishments in Massachusetts
1985 establishments in Rhode Island
Blackstone River Valley National Historical Park